Diego Caccia (born 31 July 1981) is an Italian racing cyclist.

External links

1981 births
Living people
Italian male cyclists
Cyclists from the Province of Bergamo